On 2 July 2005, a Live 8 concert was held in Red Square, Moscow, Russia. Although not on such a large scale as the concerts held at Hyde Park, London and Philadelphia, it was still a momentous occasion for Russia.

The event is also referred to as "Live 8 Moscow" or "Live 8 Russia".

Lineup
 Agatha Christie - "Триллер" (The Thriller), "Ковёр-самолёт" (The Magic Carpet), "Сказочная тайга" (The Fairy Taiga), "Как на войне" (Like At War) (M 20:06)
 Bi-2 (M 20:26)
 Bravo (M 20:46)
 Dolphin (M 21:06)
 Douglas Vale - Popular, A Little While, Crush...Interrupted, En El Tunel (M 21:26)
 Jungo (M 21:46)
 Linda (M 22:06)
 Moral Code X (M 22:26)
 Red Elvises - "I Wanna See You Bellydance", "Ticket To Japan", "Kosmonaut Petrov" (M 22:46)
 Splean (M 23:06)
 Garik Sukachev (M 23:26)
 Valery Sutkin (M 23:46)
 Aliona Sviridova (M 00:06)
 Pet Shop Boys - "It's a Sin", "Suburbia", "Opportunities (Let's Make Lots of Money)", "Domino Dancing", "New York City Boy", "Always on My Mind", "Where the Streets Have No Name (I Can't Take My Eyes off You)", "West End Girls", "Left to My Own Devices", "Go West", "It's a Sin" (M 00:26)

Live 8 events
Events in Moscow
Music in Moscow
2005 in Russia
2005 in Moscow
July 2005 events in Europe
Red Square
July 2005 events in Russia